Malaysia participated in the 2011 Commonwealth Youth Games held in the British Crown Dependency of Isle of Man from 7 to 13 September 2011. Their participation marked their fourth Commonwealth Youth Games appearance, one of the highest among the Commonwealth of Nations. Malaysia was represented by the Olympic Council of Malaysia, which is responsible for Malaysian participation in the multi-sport events, including Commonwealth Games and Commonwealth Youth Games. Malaysian delegation consisted of 18 athletes competed in four different sports— athletics, badminton, cycling, and swimming. This was an increase in the number of athletes from the nation's last appearance at the Games, when 10 athletes were sent to the 2008 Commonwealth Youth Games in Pune. Malaysia dominated in the badminton events, winning all but one of the five gold medals on offer, the only other gold was won by P. V. Sindhu of India in women's singles. All the medals came from badminton.

Background
Malaysia became a member of the Commonwealth of Nations in 1957, and debuted in the Commonwealth Games, the then British Empire and Commonwealth Games, in 1966 in Kingston, Jamaica. Malaysia has competed at every edition of the Games. It entered 10 athletes (five men and five women) in the 2008 Commonwealth Youth Games in Pune, India, competed in athletes and badminton. Malaysian contingents won a total of 13 medals in Pune, including three gold and four silver, leading to the country finishing seventh in the final medal table standings.

Medallists

Athletics

Boys
Track events

Badminton

Cycling

Road

Swimming

Boys

Girls

References

Nations at the 2011 Commonwealth Youth Games
2011 in Malaysian sport
Youth sport in Malaysia